The genus Leistes are predominantly South American grassland birds called meadowlarks. The genus was previously lumped with the North American meadowlarks in the genus Sturnella.

It includes five species of largely insectivorous grassland birds. In all species the male at least has a black or brown back and extensively red underparts.

List of species
There are five widely accepted members of the genus.

Taxonomy
By the early 20th century, the meadowlarks were split. Only the "yellow-breasted" meadowlarks (eastern and western meadowlarks, including Lilian's) remained in the genus Sturnella. The red-breasted and white-browed meadowlarks were moved to the genus Leistes, while the pampas meadowlark, Peruvian meadowlark and long-tailed meadowlark made up the genus Pezites, which was established by Cabanis in 1851. By the late 20th century, all meadowlarks were lumped in the genus Sturnella. In 2017, all the red-breasted meadowlarks were merged into the genus Leistes.

References

Sources

 New World Blackbirds by Jaramillo and Burke,

Further reading

External links
Sturnella videos, photos and sounds on the Internet Bird Collection

 
Bird genera
Taxa named by Nicholas Aylward Vigors